The Very Best of 1990–2000 is a 2001 compilation album by Sarah Brightman. It features songs from her albums produced by Frank Peterson. Also notable is the Richard Marx collaboration "The Last Words You Said" makes its debut in the UK, as it was previously available only on the U.S. version of Eden.

Track listing

Charts and certifications

Weekly charts

Year-end charts

Certifications

References

2001 compilation albums
Sarah Brightman albums
Albums produced by Frank Peterson
East West Records compilation albums